The Rizal Memorial Track and Football Stadium (simply known as the Rizal Memorial Stadium; officially the Simeon Toribio Track Stadium) is the main stadium of the Rizal Memorial Sports Complex in Manila, Philippines. It served as the main stadium of the 1954 Asian Games and the Southeast Asian Games on three occasions. The stadium is also officially the home of the Philippines national football team and some Philippines Football League matches.

Background 

Since the 1930s, it has hosted all major local football tournaments and some international matches.  When a new tartan track was laid out at the oval for the country's initial hosting of the 1981 Southeast Asian Games, the venue became a hub for athletics and the football pitch's condition slowly deteriorated.  It eventually became unsuitable for international matches which meant the Philippine national team would have to play their home games at an alternate venue.

In 2010, the Philippine Sports Commission (PSC) partnered with the De La Salle University to refurbish the stadium's football pitch. The stadium had undergone a major renovation program with the Philippine Football Federation (PFF) spend  for the renovation of the locker rooms, comfort rooms, and the fiberglass seats. The renovation was completed in 2011 and was first used for the game of Azkals against Sri Lanka in 2014 FIFA World Cup qualifiers round on July 3, 2011 which was the first international football game held at the stadium in the decades, where the Philippine national team won 4-0 overall. However, the pitch (which was a natural grass) deteriorated again due to the number of football and rugby events, that led the PSC to convert it into an artificial turf in 2014. In 2015, its football pitch received the 2-star accreditation from FIFA, making it the  first football pitch in the Philippines to have it.

The stadium has undergone a major renovation after it was designated as the venue for the men's football event of the 2019 Southeast Asian Games New individual seats are to be installed in the spectator area of the stadium outside the main grandstand. The renovation also includes the upgrading of its rubberized track oval. The renovation will be funded from the  given by the Philippine Amusement and Gaming Corporation to the Philippine Sports Commission.

In August 2021, the stadium was officially renamed as the Simeon Toribio Track Stadium, after Olympic high jumper Simeon Toribio.

Notable events at the Rizal Memorial Stadium

Sports events 
1934 Far Eastern Championship Games
1954 Asian Games
1966 and 1970 AFC Youth Championship
1981 and 1991 Southeast Asian Games
1993 and 2003 Asian Athletics Championships
2005 Southeast Asian Games 
2005 ASEAN Para Games
2012 Asian Five Nations Division I 
2012 and 2014 Philippine Peace Cup
2012 and 2014 AFF Suzuki Cup Semifinals
2014 FIFA World Cup qualification
2014 AFC Challenge Cup qualification Group E
2016 AFF Suzuki Cup
2017 AFC Cup
2018 AFC Cup
2017 Philippines Football League
2018 Philippines Football League
2018 Copa Paulino Alcantara
2019 Philippines Football League
2019 Philippine Premiere League
2019 Southeast Asian Games 
2020 AFC Champions League qualifying play-offs
2020 AFC Cup
2022 AFF Women's Championship
2022–23 Philippines Football League

The first international rugby test in the stadium was held when the Philippines hosted the 2012 Asian Five Nations Division I tournament, which doubled as a qualifying tournament for the 2015 Rugby World Cup; the goal posts were erected just days prior to the tournament.

Entertainment events

On July 4, 1966, the Rizal Memorial Stadium hosted two sold-out concerts of the Beatles held in Manila and was one of only three cities in Asia (other than Tokyo and Hong Kong) they have ever played in. The combined attendance was 80,000 with the evening concert registering 50,000 paying audience and became the Beatles' second-biggest concert ever.

COVID-19 pandemic 
During the Philippine Government's "Hatid Tulong" program, the stadium was used as the designated temporary holding place for Locally Stranded Individuals (LSIs). The number of individuals and families hoping to be sent back to their respective provinces exceeded the limit of capacity. This raised concerns over the resulting lack of social distancing and Health and Safety guidelines due to the hundreds of people being in close proximity. With the stadium being full, many other individuals who availed of the said program ended up sleeping and gathering outside the stadium complex.

See also 
List of football stadiums in the Philippines
Rizal Memorial Sports Complex
Rizal Memorial Baseball Stadium
Rizal Memorial Coliseum
New Clark City Athletics Stadium
Philippine Sports Stadium
Biñan Football Stadium
Panaad Stadium

Notes

References

External links 

Rizal Memorial Stadium photo at WorldStadiums.com

Athletics (track and field) venues in the Philippines
Football venues in the Philippines
Stadiums of the Asian Games
Sports venues in Manila
Buildings and structures in Malate, Manila
Art Deco architecture in the Philippines
National stadiums
Sports venues completed in 1934
Juan M. Arellano buildings
1934 establishments in the Philippines
Venues of the 1954 Asian Games
Asian Games athletics venues
Asian Games football venues
Southeast Asian Games stadiums
Southeast Asian Games athletics venues
Southeast Asian Games football venues